Ginger Baker's Air Force is the debut album by Ginger Baker's Air Force, released in 1970. This album is a recording of a sold-out live show at the Royal Albert Hall, on 15 January 1970, with the original 10-piece line up. The gatefold LP cover was designed left-handed; i.e. the front cover artwork was on what traditionally would be considered the back and vice versa.

Critical reception 
The album was not well received by critics, including Greil Marcus of Rolling Stone and Village Voice critic Robert Christgau, who found the sound quality "terrible" and complained that "bands led by drummers tend to leave a lot of space for drum solos". By contrast, Bruce Eder from AllMusic later said the album sounded good for a Royal Albert Hall recording and called it "a must-own for jazz-rock, Afro-fusion, blues-rock, or percussion fans".

Track listing

Personnel

Musicians
Ginger Baker – drums (all tracks), percussion (all tracks), timpani (all tracks), vocals ("Early in the Morning")
Denny Laine – guitars, vocals ("Early in the Morning", "Man of Constant Sorrow")
Ric Grech – bass guitar, violin ("Man of Constant Sorrow")
Steve Winwood – Hammond organ, bass guitar ("Man of Constant Sorrow"), vocals ("Don't Care" and "Do What You Like")
Chris Wood – tenor saxophone, flute
Graham Bond – Hammond organ, alto saxophone ("Da Da Man"), vocals ("Aiko Biaye")
Harold McNair – tenor and alto saxophones, alto flute
Jeanette Jacobs – vocals ("Da Da Man" and "Don't Care")
Remi Kabaka – drums, percussion ("Toad")
Phil Seamen – drums, percussion ("Toad")

Production
Ginger Baker – producer
Jimmy Miller – producer
Roy Thomas Baker – engineer
Andy Johns – engineer
Nigel Williamson – liner notes
Russ Landau – reissue coordination

Charts
Album – Billboard

Single – Billboard (UK)

References

Ginger Baker's Air Force albums
Albums produced by Jimmy Miller
1970 live albums
Baker, Ginger
Polydor Records live albums
Albums produced by Ginger Baker
Live albums recorded at the Royal Albert Hall
1970 debut albums